Lucas Barros da Cunha (born 21 August 1999), known as Lucas Barros, is a Brazilian footballer who plays for Portuguese club Gil Vicente as a left back.

Club career
Born in Rio de Janeiro, Lucas Barros joined Botafogo's youth setup in 2008, aged nine. On 14 June 2018, he signed a new contract with the club until December of the following year.

Promoted to the first team ahead of the 2019 season, Lucas Barros made his senior debut on 26 January of that year, coming on as a second-half substitute for Jonathan in a 2–1 Campeonato Carioca home loss against Flamengo. He extended his contract until 2022 in March, and made his Série A debut on 12 June, replacing Erik late into a 1–0 home defeat to Grêmio.

On 2 July 2022, Barros signed with Gil Vicente.

References

External links

1999 births
Footballers from Rio de Janeiro (city)
Living people
Brazilian footballers
Association football defenders
Botafogo de Futebol e Regatas players
S.C. Covilhã players
Gil Vicente F.C. players
Campeonato Brasileiro Série A players
Liga Portugal 2 players
Brazilian expatriate footballers
Expatriate footballers in Portugal
Brazilian expatriate sportspeople in Portugal